The Škoda Kushaq is a subcompact crossover SUV (B-segment) manufactured by the Czech automaker Škoda Auto in India since 2021. The vehicle is heavily based on the Volkswagen T-Cross and its derivative for the Indian market, the Volkswagen Taigun. The name 'Kushaq' was derived from the Sanskrit word 'Kushak' which denotes 'King' or 'Emperor'.

Overview 

The vehicle was previewed as the Vision IN Concept in February 2020. The production model debuted in 18 March 2021 as the first product from Škoda Auto Volkswagen India’s "India 2.0 project". The car is built on the Volkswagen Group MQB A0 IN platform dedicated for Indian market and closely related with the Volkswagen Taigun. It is manufactured in Chakan, Maharashtra, India with a local parts content of 95 percent to achieve a lower price point.

The 1.0-litre engine is available with 6-speed manual and 6-speed torque converter automatic gearbox options, while the 1.5-litre TSI unit, is available with a 6-speed manual and a 7-speed dual-clutch automatic option. Both engines are produced at Škoda's Chakan plant.

In 2021, the Kushaq contains 95% local parts.

In May 2022, Škoda released the Monte Carlo edition for the Kushaq.

Powertrain

Safety 
The Škoda Kushaq is equipped as standard with double frontal airbags, anti-lock brakes, i-Size anchorages, ESC (electronic stability control), multi-collision brakes, a claimed high-strength steel structure, front and rear seatbelt pretensioners and three-point seatbelts with adjustable head restraints for all passengers. The highest 'Style' trim level is additionally equipped with side and curtain airbags, hill start assistance and a tyre pressure monitor. At launch, side and curtain airbags and the tyre pressure monitor were not available on cars equipped with an automatic transmission, but this has since been corrected.

In October 2022 the Kushaq was independently rated for safety by the Global New Car Assessment Programme (Global NCAP) based on crash-testing of a Volkswagen Taigun at Volkswagen's expense, and scored five stars for adult and child occupant protection, the first car to do so under the organisation's new assessment protocols. In the frontal offset test, protection of all body regions was good or acceptable, except for the driver's left tibia. In the side mobile barrier and pole tests, protection of the driver's chest was rated marginal, and protection of the driver's abdomen was rated acceptable in the side pole test. The Kushaq could pass minimum European regulatory requirements for electronic stability control and pedestrian protection.

References

External links 

 Official website 

Kushaq
Crossover sport utility vehicles
Front-wheel-drive vehicles
Mini sport utility vehicles
Cars introduced in 2021
Global NCAP small off-road